This is a list of notable hotels in Canada.

Alberta 

 Banff Springs Hotel, Banff
 Chateau Lacombe Hotel, Edmonton
 Chateau Lake Louise, Lake Louise
 Coast Edmonton House, Edmonton
 Fairmont Palliser Hotel, Calgary
 Hotel Macdonald, Edmonton
 Jasper Park Lodge, Jasper
 Prince of Wales Hotel, Waterton Lakes National Park
 The Rimrock Resort Hotel, Banff

British Columbia

 Empire Landmark Hotel, Vancouver
 The Empress, Victoria
 Fairmont Pacific Rim, Vancouver
 Hotel Europe, Vancouver 
 Hotel Georgia, Vancouver
 Hotel Vancouver, Vancouver
 Hyatt Regency Vancouver
 The Listel Hotel, Vancouver
 Living Shangri-La, Vancouver
 The Melville, Vancouver
 Sheraton Wall Centre, Vancouver
 Sylvia Hotel, Vancouver

Manitoba 

 Fort Garry Hotel, Winnipeg

New Brunswick 

 The Algonquin, St. Andrews

Newfoundland and Labrador 

 Hotel Newfoundland, St. John's

Northwest Territories

 Explorer Hotel, Yellowknife
 The Gold Range, Yellowknife

Nova Scotia 

 Digby Pines Resort, Digby
 Lord Nelson Hotel, Halifax
 The Westin Nova Scotian, Halifax

Ontario

 Caesars Windsor, Windsor
 Château Laurier, Ottawa
 Chelsea Hotel, Toronto
 Drake Hotel, Toronto
 Duke of York Inn, Toronto
 Fairmont Royal York, Toronto
 Ford Hotel, Toronto
 Four Seasons Hotel Toronto, Toronto
 Gladstone Hotel, Toronto
 Guild Inn, Toronto
 Hotel Waverly, Toronto
 Inn on the Park, Toronto
 InterContinental Toronto Centre, Toronto
 John Finch's Hotel, Toronto
 King Edward Hotel, Toronto
 Lord Elgin Hotel, Ottawa
 Lord Simcoe Hotel, Toronto
 Marriott Niagara Falls Hotel Fallsview & Spa, Niagara Falls
 Marriott on the Falls Hotel, Niagara Falls
 Miller Tavern, Toronto
 New Broadview House Hotel, Toronto
 New Edwin Hotel, Toronto
 Niagara Fallsview Casino Resort, Niagara Falls
 Old Mill Inn & Spa, Toronto
 Ottawa Marriott Hotel, Ottawa
 Park Hyatt Toronto, Toronto
 Prince Arthur Hotel, Thunder Bay
 Radisson Toronto East Hotel, Toronto
 Regal Constellation Hotel, Toronto
 Rossin House Hotel, Toronto
 Russell House, Ottawa
 Sheraton Centre Toronto Hotel, Toronto
 Sheraton on the Falls, Niagara Falls
 Spadina Hotel, Toronto
 Westin Harbour Castle Hotel, Toronto
 Windsor Arms Hotel, Toronto

Prince Edward Island 

 Dalvay-by-the-Sea, Prince Edward Island National Park
 Hotel Charlottetown, Charlottetown

Quebec

 Auberge Le Saint-Gabriel, Montreal
 Chateau Aeroport-Mirabel, Mirabel
 Château Champlain, Montreal
 Château Frontenac, Quebec City
 Château Montebello, Montebello
 Clarendon Hotel, Quebec City
 Hovey Manor, North Hatley
 Ice Hotel, Quebec City
 Laurentian Hotel, Montreal
 Le Centre Sheraton Montreal Hotel, Montreal
 Les Cours Mont-Royal, Montreal
 Manoir Richelieu, La Malbaie
 Ottawa Hotel, Montreal, Montreal
 Place Viger, Montreal
 Queen Elizabeth Hotel, Montreal
 Ritz-Carlton Montreal, Montreal
 Windsor Hotel, Montreal

Saskatchewan 

 Chateau Qu'Appelle, Regina
 Delta Bessborough, Saskatoon
 Hotel Saskatchewan, Regina
 Hotel Senator, Saskatoon
 Radisson Hotel Saskatoon, Saskatoon
 Temple Gardens Mineral Spa Resort, Moose Jaw

Yukon 
 Downtown Hotel, Dawson City

See also 
 List of defunct hotels in Canada

 
Canada